Jack Grealish (born 1997) is an Irish hurler who plays for Galway Senior Championship club Gort and at inter-county level with the Galway senior hurling team. He usually lines out as a right corner-back.

Career statistics

Honours

Gort
Galway Senior Hurling Championship (1): 2014

Galway
All-Ireland Senior Hurling Championship (1): 2017
Leinster Senior Hurling Championship (1): 2017
National Hurling League (1): 2017
Leinster Under-21 Hurling Championship (1): 2018
All-Ireland Minor Hurling Championship (1): 2015

References

1997 births
Living people
Gort hurlers
Galway inter-county hurlers